The 32nd Annual Australian Recording Industry Association Music Awards (generally known as ARIA Music Awards or simply The ARIAs) are a series of award ceremonies which include the 2018 ARIA Artisan Awards, ARIA Hall of Fame Awards, ARIA Fine Arts Awards and the ARIA Awards. The ARIA Awards ceremony was held on 28 November 2018 and broadcast from the Star Event Centre, Sydney around Australia on the Nine Network.

On 25 September 2018 it was announced that Keith Urban would host the event. Final nominations were provided on 11 October 2018. At the same time ARIA presented trophies for the winners of the Artisan and Fine Arts awards. In total Amy Shark won four categories from nine nominations, while Geoffrey Gurrumul Yunupingu posthumously won four from seven nominations.

Country music singer-songwriter and musician, Kasey Chambers, was inducted into the ARIA Hall of Fame by Paul Kelly. Fellow singers, Missy Higgins, Kate Miller-Heidke, and Amy Sheppard provided their rendition of "Not Pretty Enough". Chambers, who had also won her ninth Best Country Album for Campfire, performed the answer song, "Ain't No Little Girl".

Performers 

Performers for the ARIA Awards ceremony:

ARIA Hall of Fame inductee

When Kasey Chambers was announced as the ARIA Hall of Fame inductee, in mid-November, she responded, "I am so proud to have been able to create the music I love in a way that has always felt so true and authentic to me and to have it reach so many people. [... It] is one of the greatest honours I could possibly imagine and I am so humbled to get the chance on the night to share the journey this little country singer from the Nullarbor has actually had."

At the ceremony Chambers was inducted by sometime collaborator, producer and fellow Hall of Famer, Paul Kelly, who recited a specially written poem for her and then accompanied her on keyboards. Fellow singers, Missy Higgins, Kate Miller-Heidke, and Amy Sheppard provided their rendition of Chambers' track, "Not Pretty Enough" and she responded with "Ain't No Little Girl". In her acceptance speech she referenced her parents, "My mum has taught me over the years that being a bitch doesn't make you strong, and being strong doesn't make you a bitch. It's knowing the difference between the two [...] My dad said to me once, 'just don’t be a dickhead'. It's been the best advice to follow … You don't have to drag other people down to get to the top."

Nominees and winners

ARIA Awards

Public voted

Fine Arts Awards

Winners are listed first and highlighted in boldface; other final nominees are listed alphabetically by artists' first name.

Artisan Awards

Winners are listed first and highlighted in boldface; other final nominees are listed alphabetically by artists' first name.

References

External links
 

2018 in Australian music
2018 music awards
ARIA Music Awards